Rangitoto College is a state coeducational secondary school, located on the North Shore of Auckland, New Zealand. Patrick Gale is the current principal.

Location
Rangitoto College is located in Mairangi Bay, on the East Coast Bays on Auckland's North Shore. The easternmost field as well as many of the classrooms on the eastern side of the school have a view of the Rangitoto Channel as well as Rangitoto Island.

History
Rangitoto College opened in 1956, with an initial roll of 180 Year 9 and 10 students (then known as Forms 3 and 4). A block and D block are the school's two original buildings; these are standard school buildings of the "1950s Single Storey" type, with long single-storey blocks of classrooms orientated east-west with a corridor connecting the classrooms on the south side.

Enrolment
Like many secondary schools in Auckland, Rangitoto operates an enrolment scheme to help curb roll numbers and prevent overcrowding. Students residing outside the zone are accepted as roll places allow per the enrollment scheme order of preference and secret ballot.

As of March, 2021, Rangitoto College had 3284 students enrolled. Of the students, 1578 were Pākehā/New Zealand European, 1165 were Asian, 198 were Māori, 65 were Pacific Islanders, 87 were International Students, 159 were MELAA, and 32 students were from other ethnicities and demographics.

Rangitoto College has a socio-economic decile rating of 10 (step Z), meaning it draws its school community from areas of highest socio-economic strata when compared to other New Zealand schools.

Recent principals
In mid-2005, principal Allan Peachey stood down in order to stand as a National Party candidate for election to Parliament. Alison Cleland took over as principal in the interim. As a result of Peachey's election as the Member of Parliament for the Tamaki electorate, David Hodge, a former student at Rangitoto College, was appointed as Principal in 2006, but left in 2017. Patrick M. Gale is the current principal.

Facilities

Auditorium 
The Rangitoto College Auditorium has a seating capacity of 960 people and is equipped with audiovisual and lighting systems, making it suitable for a wide range of events. The auditorium also has a spacious stage with backstage facilities for performers, including dressing rooms and storage space.

Library 
The Rangitoto College Library is a modern facility that offers a wide range of resources and services to support students and staff in their academic pursuits. The library has a large collection of books, magazines, journals, and online resources, including e-books and databases.

Sports Fields 
The main sports fields at Rangitoto College include a full-size artificial turf hockey field and several grass fields for sports such as soccer, rugby, and cricket. The school is located near the AUT Millennium, which also has a running track, long jump pit, and other facilities for athletics events.

Gymnasium 
The main gymnasium at Rangitoto College is a large and modern facility that is equipped with a range of equipment and facilities for sports such as basketball, volleyball, and badminton. It also has a fitness centre and space for other activities.

In addition to the main gymnasium, the school also has two smaller gymnasiums that are used for junior sports and physical education classes.

Academic performance
Rangitoto College is a decile 10 school, meaning that, as the ERO (Education Review Office) puts it, Rangitoto draws its students from an area of 'least socio-economic disadvantage'. The data show that it performs at, or above, the average level for decile 10 schools nationally. Like other decile 10 schools, Rangitoto performs better than schools from areas of greater socio-economic disadvantage.

Prior to Bursary being replaced by the National Certificate of Educational Achievement Rangitoto had at least one student recognised as New Zealand's top scholar in a subject between 2001 and 2003; in 2003 Rangitoto had three four top-scholars including top all-round Female Māori Scholar. 5. In 2006 a Rangitoto College student was named "Top Scholar in New Zealand" for the subject of history in 2006 based on the NCEA framework.

In 2013, 94.4 percent of students leaving Rangitoto College held at least NCEA Level 1, 89.5 percent held at least NCEA Level 2, and 76.3 percent held at least University Entrance. This is compared to 85.2%, 74.2%, and 49.0% respectively for all students nationally.

In 2021, Rangitoto College students collectively achieved 244 scholarship passes in the New Zealand Scholarship exams which included 34 "Outstanding" passes. Sixteen students gained four or more scholarship passes, with a further fourteen students gaining three scholarship passes. Six students gained Outstanding Scholar Awards (~60 nationwide) and one student, with ten scholarship passes, gained a Premier Scholar Award (Top ~12 nationwide). The Premier Award winner was also the Top Subject Scholar for Art History, Geography, and Statistics while one of the Outstanding award winners was the Top Subject Scholar for Health & Physical Education. This placed the school as the top scholarship school in New Zealand for the fourth year in a row.

Notable alumni

Amy Adams – member of parliament for the Selwyn electorate
Marco Alexander – basketball player
Terenzo Bozzone – athlete
Claudia Bunge – New Zealand international football player
Graham Candy – actor/musician
Oliver Driver – actor/TV personality
Chloe Gong – author
Mikey Havoc – media personality
Lizzy Igasan – hockey player
Anna Leat – New Zealand international football player
Alex Maloney – Olympic sailor, silver medallist in the 49er FX class at Rio 2016
Sean Marks – former basketball player in the NBA / Tall Blacks, current GM for the Brooklyn Nets
Dean O'Gorman – actor, artist, photographer
Erica Stanford – member of parliament for the East Coast Bays electorate
Corney Swanepoel – Olympic swimmer
Louise Upston – member of parliament for the Taupō electorate
Anna Willcox-Silfverberg – skier and TV sports reporter
Tai Wynyard – professional basketball player; former college player for the University of Kentucky
Bands
Midnight Youth – band formed at Rangitoto College
The Naked and Famous – band comprising majority of members from Rangitoto College

References

External links

Educational institutions established in 1956
Secondary schools in Auckland
North Shore, New Zealand
1956 establishments in New Zealand